Occupational Hazard is Unsane's fourth studio album. It was released in 1998 through Relapse Records.

Critical reception
Bake Butler of AllMusic described the album as "getting hit by a semi, kicked in the teeth, and thrown down three flights of stairs all at once. [...] In a way unlike almost any other, they scream in your face fairly emotional, damaging lyrics, while breaking the musical boundaries, as well as your eardrums." CMJ New Music Monthly called it "still all meat-grinder riffs slathered on top of a pummeling, breakneck-tempo rhythm section."

Track listing
All lyrics written by Chris Spencer, except "Scam", written by Dave Curran. All songs written by Unsane.

Credits
Vincent Signorelli – drums
Chris Spencer – guitar, vocals
Dave Curran – bass, vocals

Footnotes

Unsane albums
1998 albums